Poli sci (also spelled poly sci) is a common abbreviation for Political science, which is a social science that deals with politics and systems of government.

Poli sci or poly sci may also refer to:
Poly Sci, a 1998 album by John Forté
Poly.Sci.187, a 2007 album by Sole
Poly-Sci, drummer for the band Pompeii 99

See also
Political Science (disambiguation)
Politics (disambiguation)